Argai: The Prophecy (Original French title: Argaï: La prophétie) is a 2000 French animated series (with 26 episodes) directed by Jean-César Suchorski and written by Sébastien Dorsey.

Plot
The story is partly set in the year 1250, partly in 2075. Angel, the fiancée of Prince Argaï, is under the spell of the Dark Queen. The evil Queen steals the youth of juvenile women and keeps them asleep for the rest of their lives. This way, she remains immortal. To save his fiancée, Argaï travels through time and meets detective Oscar Lightbulb, his assistant Barnaby and his secretary, Moony Moon. They decide to help Argaï with his battle against the queen and the rescue of his beloved. To defeat the queen, they have to awake Angel with an antidote which contains 13 unique ingredients. Their first challenge is to find each of these ingredients.

Unlike most stories involving time travel, when a character is killed in a time that is not their own, they are returned to their own time instead of dying. This is why it is necessary for the heroes to defeat Queen Orial in 2075 and for Queen Orial to kill Argaï in 1250, as it would not be permanent otherwise.

Broadcast 
The series was premiered on 2 September 2000 on TF1 in France. In the UK, the show airs on Disney Channel from 15 April 2001 to September 2002. In Italy, the show airs on Fox Kids and Jetix. In Spain, the show airs on La 1, Antena 3, and Clan. In the Middle East, the show airs on Spacetoon.

Episodes
Chapter I. Prince Argai
Chapter II. The Man in the Mask 
Chapter III. New York, 2075
Chapter IV. F-107
Chapter V. The Great Journey
Chapter VI. Notre-Dame de Paris
Chapter VII. The Mandrake
Chapter VIII. The Pharaoh's Amulet
Chapter IX. The Road to the Crusades
Chapter X. Alyasha
Chapter XI. Venice Submerged
Chapter XII. Brother Tich's Escape
Chapter XIII. The Enchanted Forest
Chapter XIV. In the Land of the Celts
Chapter XV. Lotus Flower
Chapter XVI. The Desert of Awikango
Chapter XVII. The Monastery of Tirloch
Chapter XVIII. The Knight Tournament
Chapter XIX. The Great Escape
Chapter XX. The Wild Orchid
Chapter XXI. The Sacred Pearl
Chapter XXII. The Thurible
Chapter XXIII. The Fairy Melusine
Chapter XXIV. The White Lady
Chapter XXV. Angele
Chapter XXVI. The Final Combat

Cast
Jean Topart - Monk
Bruno Choël - Argaï
Christian Alers - Oscar Lightbulb
Laura Préjean - Angèle
Marie-Christine Adam - The Dark Queen
Henri Labussière - Hugsley Barnes
Patricia Legrand - Miss Moon
Patrick Préjean - Barnaby
Benoît Allemane - Pacha
Jean Barney - King Khar (Argaï's father)
Michel Vigné - Narrator, the Devil

References

External links

AnimeGuides - Argaï: La prophétie

2000 French television series debuts
2000 French television series endings
French children's animated adventure television series
French children's animated science fantasy television series
2000s French animated television series
French-language television shows
Fiction set in the 13th century
Animated television series about lions
Television series about revenge
French time travel television series
Television shows set in New York (state)
Television shows set in Europe
Television shows set in France
Television series set in the 2070s
Television series set in the future
Cyberpunk television series
Television series set in the Middle Ages
TF1 original programming